Three ships in the United States Navy have been named USS Galena.  They were named for various communities that, in turn, were named for a native lead sulfide, the chief ore of lead. Cities, towns, and villages with the name exist in Kansas, Illinois, Maryland, Missouri, Ohio, and Alaska.

 , was a steamship during the American Civil War.
 , a steamship, was commissioned in 1880 and decommissioned in 1890.
 , a patrol boat, was commissioned in 1943 and decommissioned in 1946.

United States Navy ship names